The Centre for Socio-economic and Environmental Studies (CSES), founded in 1996, is an independent, non-profit, research institute based at Kochi, Kerala, India.

Overview 
The centre works to fill the gap between the academic world on the one hand and the policy makers, opinion shapers and the general public on the other through its research, training programs, conferences, workshops, public lectures and publications. CSES has been associating with other research institutions, central, state and local governments and developmental agencies to conduct a wide range of research studies, projects and activities. The centre is engaged in situational analysis, evaluation studies, need assessment studies, knowledge attitude and practice (KAP) studies, participatory rural appraisal (PRA), project monitoring and geographic information system (GIS)-based planning. The centre has also conducted several multi-locational studies, including large-scale sample surveys all over South India.

Key research areas 
The centre has made significant contributions in the following priority areas:

Governance and public service delivery 
A major area of interest of CSES is how services are delivered to the general public by government agencies. From time to time, CSES has looked into service delivery of various public agencies, including government schools, health care facilities, anganwadis, welfare institutions, local governments and government offices. Through this research, CSES has identified service delivery parameters important to the citizens and developed performance indicators across these parameters that facilitate evaluation over time. Most of these studies are commissioned by various Government agencies including the Modernising Government Program (MGP), Kerala Local Government Service Delivery Project (KLGSDP) and the Administrative Reforms Commission (ARC) of the Government of Kerala. The studies on water governance conducted for the World Bank and Jalanidhi focused on the sustainability of small water supply schemes.

Poverty and social exclusion 
The Kerala Model of Development which won accolades for high social development with low economic growth, also had its "outliers" or sections of the society that the development bypassed; namely the Scheduled Tribes and the Fisher-folk. Bringing the issues faced by such marginalized sections into mainstream academic and policy-level discourse is an objective that CSES has persistently followed. Research at CSES also addresses issues of other groups of marginalized sections in the society such as the rural and urban poor, migrant workers, elderly and disabled. For instance, studies on alternative education, tribal health, education of migrant children, management of household finances by poor, indebtedness among rural poor, welfare legislation for vulnerable groups, etc. bring out issues faced by these marginalized sections in domains such as education, health and livelihood. Similarly, the marginalization lens is applied to other research pursued at CSES to understand the dimensions of inequality and exclusion faced by these vulnerable sections vis-à-vis others, be it in service delivery, local governance or social development.

Public finance 
Right from its inception, public finance was one of the core areas of research activity at the centre. Issues related to state finances and fiscal federalism- fiscal powers of the central, state and local governments are some of the key research topics pursued in this area. The centre has examined the implications of the recommendations of successive Central Finance Commissions to Kerala through its studies. Public expenditure management in the social sector is an area in which the centre has engaged extensively in the past. CSES has also undertaken the analysis of state and local governments for children, Scheduled Tribes and Persons with Disabilities. These topics within public finance are closely intertwined with other core areas of the centre such as inclusive governance, public service delivery and decentralized governance.

Decentralization 
Another major area of research where CSES has done various studies is that of Decentralization; research done includes studies on service delivery, planning, budgeting and financial management and analysis of local government budgets conducted for UNICEF, Commission for Protection of Child Rights, Kerala State Planning Board and Action Aid.  CSES has also been extending technical support to several rural and urban local governments in different sectors in the preparation of perspective plans and for GIS based planning and preparation of watershed development plans. CSES is an 'Institutional National Level Monitor' of the Ministry of Rural Development, Government of India and is involved in monitoring rural development programs and the functioning of the local governments in different states in India.

Education 
Education has been a major research theme of CSES ever since its inception. Being located in Kerala, a region which received national and international attention for its achievement in the field of education, CSES has tried to develop an insider's perspective of the strengths and weaknesses of State's education system right from pre-school education to professional and higher education. Broadly, CSES studies examined the social, economic, financial and management aspects of the education sector. Some of the specific aspects examined include exclusionary trends in the education sector, education of marginalized groups such as children from tribal families, children with disabilities and children of migrant labor, entry barriers to professional and higher education, private cost of education, changing enrollment patterns, functioning of the alternative schooling system, grants-in-aid policies and practices of the state government and service delivery in government schools.

Labor and migration 
Labor studies is a prominent research theme pursued at the CSES particularly with a focus on labor market transformation in the state of Kerala. CSES conducted a pioneering study on interstate labor migration to Kerala. Of late, with increasing long-distance labor inflows to Kerala, CSES has been focusing on research to assess vulnerabilities encountered by migrant workers, education of migrant children and social protection programs available and accessible to them. Apart from the studies on interstate labor migration, CSES focuses on international labor migration as well as labor market outcomes of youth.

Urban development 
Impact and implications of urbanization is a cross-cutting theme addressed in several research projects of CSES. In an effort to better understand facets of urbanization, CSES has undertaken a research study on the commuting pattern for work in Kochi which captures how mobility requirements of those commuting daily to the city are side-lined in city planning. A study commissioned by the GIZ on urban housing for those without formal rights in Kochi documents the complex web of statutory and customary systems one needs to mediate to secure access to housing. CSES research in this area also included service delivery of urban local governments, consequences of inter-state migration on urban governance and child budget analysis of urban local governments.

Demography and health 
Dynamics of Kerala's demographic transition— high life expectancy, low infant, child and maternal mortality, decreasing share of children and increasing share of elderly in the population —has been a focus of research at the CSES. These demographic issues are explored to identify changes observed, adaptations required in social sectors of education and health and in relation to the population pressure on land.

Health is a domain where CSES has worked extensively across regions, by conducting various rounds of District Level Household Survey on Reproductive and Child Health, Global Adult Tobacco Survey and Global Youth Tobacco Survey in different states. CSES has also conducted studies on the provision of health care services by the government and health care utilization, health care expenditure and health outcomes of the general population as well as vulnerable sections such as women, tribal, disabled and elderly. Research studies of the centre, highlight the health issues relevant in the context of Kerala, which are different from those faced at the national level, and thus require a different approach and prioritization.

Gender 
Apart from undertaking researches exclusively on women's issues viz. health, livelihood and employment, gender has figured as a major component in various studies of CSES. Through different research projects, CSES has looked into the implications of government policies, legislation and interventions on the lives of women. In 2018, a dedicated unit to undertake interdisciplinary research on gender issues— Gender Research Unit (GRU) was set up within CSES to promote well-informed, evidence-based policy reforms and to build a network among scholars, non-governmental organisations (NGOs) and other development partners working on gender issues. Since then, GRU has undertaken studies on indebtedness among rural poor, labor market outcome and documentation of livelihood program introduced for tribal women—where the gender dimensions were looked into in detail.

Disability 
CSES has been at the forefront in guiding government agencies about disability and the issues faced by Persons with Disabilities across their life course in various domains such as education, health, employment and livelihood, transport and communication, etc. through an exploration into various initiatives taken by the government for their welfare and rights. The experience that CSES gained through disability studies in different parts of the country for Leonard Cheshire has also helped in understanding regional issues and alternate solutions.

GIS applications 
CSES uses digital mapping and geographic information systems (GIS) services in its projects.  Such projects include preparation of river bank atlas, digital mapping of sand deposits in rivers, GIS based watershed development plans and mapping of natural resources and other resources. CSES is an off-campus training centre of the outreach program of the Indian Institute of Remote Sensing (IIRS), Dehradun. Courses are offered in Remote Sensing and GIS.

Internship 
CSES offers internship programs for students from Indian and foreign universities pursuing Post Graduate Degrees or PhD in social science (economics, sociology, anthropology political science, social work, gender studies, development studies), journalism, environmental studies and related disciplines.

Documentation/library 
CSES has a good collection of valuable documents and research materials. Researchers, students, policy makers, social and political activists access the centre's library.

References 

Research institutes in Kochi
Think tanks
1996 establishments in Kerala
Research institutes established in 1996